Michael Brooks (1935 – November 20, 2020) was a British-born music historian, archivist, consultant, and producer.

Biography
Brooks was born in Tooting, London, and moved to New York City in 1966. He began his music career in 1971, assisting and producing records with John Hammond of Columbia Records. This collaboration resulted in many reissues of jazz, pop, big band, and country music artifacts, currently on the Legacy Recordings label. In later life Brooks worked at Sony Music Entertainment as a consultant.

He died in November 2020, aged 85.

Discography
Brooks' credits on many various projects include the following:

Producer
Duke Ellington: The Essential Duke Ellington
Duke Ellington: Piano in the Background
Duke Ellington: Festival Session
Duke Ellington: Masterpieces by Ellington (Bonus Tracks)
Duke Ellington: OKeh Ellington
Duke Ellington: Blues in Orbit (Bonus Tracks)
Duke Ellington: Piano in the Foreground (Bonus Tracks)
Louis Armstrong: Essential Louis Armstrong
Louis Armstrong: Hot Fives, Vol. 1
Louis Armstrong: Hot Fives & Hot Sevens, Vol. 2
Billie Holiday: Billie Holiday Collection, Vol. 1
Billie Holiday: Billie Holiday Collection, Vol. 2
Billie Holiday: Billie Holiday Collection, Vol. 4
Billie Holiday: Love Songs, Vol. 2
Billie Holiday: Blue Billie (Columbia)
Billie Holiday: Lady Day Swings!
Lester Young: Evening of a Basie-ite PREZ
Cab Calloway: Cab Calloway (Featuring Chu Berry)
Bix Beiderbecke: Vol. 1: Singin' the Blues
Charlie Christian: Genius of the Electric Guitar (Columbia Box Set)
Benny Goodman: The Essential Benny Goodman (Bluebird/Legacy)
Tommy Dorsey: The Sentimental Gentleman of Swing: Centennial Collection
Various Artists: PROGRESSIONS: 100 Years Of Jazz Guitars
Various Artists: Art Deco: The Crooners
Various Artists: Real Kansas City
Various Artists: Now That's Chicago!
Various Artists: Stars of the Apollo
Various Artists: Little Club Jazz: Small Groups in the 30s (New World Records)

Liner Notes
Billie Holiday: Billie Holiday Collection, Vol. 1
Billie Holiday: Billie Holiday Collection, Vol. 2
Billie Holiday: Billie Holiday Collection, Vol. 3
Billie Holiday: Billie Holiday Collection, Vol. 4
Lester Young: Evening of a Basie-ite PREZ
Bix Beiderbecke: Vol. 1: Singin' the Blues
Various Artists: Art Deco: The Crooners
Various Artists: This Is Art Deco
Various Artists: Now That's Chicago!
Various Artists: Swing Time! The Fabulous Big Band Era 1925-1955

Brooks' world music projects include the Sony Legacy reissue "Cuban Music: 1909-1951" and the Yiddish compilation "From Avenue A to the Great White Way." He also specialized in identifying obscure pre-1950 recordings and served as the project manager on the 19-hour PBS Ken Burns Presents Jazz compilation series of 22 single-discs, as well as a five-disc box set historical summary.

Awards
Brooks has been nominated for Grammy awards 16 times. His Grammy awards wins include:
1978: Historical Reissue, The Lester Young Story, Vol. 3
1978: Album Notes, A Bing Crosby Collection, Volumes 1 and 2
1979: Historical Reissue, Billie Holiday, Giants of Jazz
1981: Historical Reissue, Hoagy Carmichael, From Stardust to Ole Buttermilk Sky
2001: Historical Reissue, Louis Armstrong, The Complete Hot Five and Hot Seven Recordings
2002: Historical Reissue, Lady Day: The Complete Billie Holiday on Columbia 1933-1944

References

Sources
http://www.grammy.com
http://www.legacyrecordings.com/
http://www.legacyrecordings.com/Billie-Holiday/Lady-Day-The-Complete-Billie-Holiday-On-Columbia-1933-1944.aspx
https://web.archive.org/web/20080416231035/http://www.allaboutjazz.com/artists/jhammond.htm
https://web.archive.org/web/20050122004115/http://www.allaboutjazz.com/php/news.php?id=1488
http://www.organissimo.org/forum/index.php?showtopic=11283

1935 births
2020 deaths
American music historians
American record producers
Grammy Award winners
American archivists
English emigrants to the United States
21st-century American historians
21st-century American male writers
American male non-fiction writers